Tibor Pál (born 15 September 1935) is a Hungarian footballer. He competed in the men's tournament at the 1960 Summer Olympics.

References

External links
 

1935 births
Living people
Hungarian footballers
Hungary international footballers
Olympic footballers of Hungary
Footballers at the 1960 Summer Olympics
Footballers from Budapest
Association football forwards
Medalists at the 1960 Summer Olympics
Olympic bronze medalists for Hungary
Olympic medalists in football